The Kothapally waterfalls is a waterfall near the southeastern coast of India at Gangaraju Madugula, near Paderu in the Visakhapatnam district of Andhra Pradesh.

The falls were only recently discovered by a village boy, Vanthala Abbi. Although the falls lack any public infrastructure, they have become a tourist attraction in the Visakhapatnam district.

Location 

The Kothapally waterfalls are surrounded by Chintapalle Mandal to the south, Paderu Mandal to the east, Venus Bayalu Mandal to the north and Madugula Mandal to the east.

References

External links 

Waterfalls of Andhra Pradesh